Thieves is a 2005 EP by the Austin, Texas band Shearwater.

Track listing
"I Can't Wait (Jonathan Meiburg)"
"You're the Coliseum (Will Sheff)"
"Mountain Laurel (Jonathan Meiburg)"
"There's a Mark Where You Were Breathing (Jonathan Meiburg)"
"Near a Garden (Will Sheff)"

External links
Misra Records
Official Shearwater site

2005 EPs
Shearwater (band) albums